Jacqueline Yorston (born 25 October 2000) is an Australian rules footballer playing for Port Adelaide in the AFL Women's competition (AFLW). She has previously played for Brisbane and Gold Coast.

She was playing for Yeronga South Brisbane in the AFL Queensland Women's League (QWAFL) when she was recruited by Brisbane as a post-draft rookie compensation selection in 2018.

She made her AFLW debut in the Lions' round 4 game against Western Bulldogs at Whitten Oval on 23 February 2019, and was awarded an AFLW Rising Star nomination after the round 6 game against Carlton at Princes Park.

Following the 2019 season, she joined the Gold Coast.

In June 2022, Yorston was traded to Port Adelaide.

Her partner is Gold Coast Titans NRL player Tanah Boyd

References

External links

2000 births
Living people
Sportswomen from Queensland
Australian rules footballers from Queensland
Port Adelaide Football Club (AFLW) players
Brisbane Lions (AFLW) players
Gold Coast Football Club (AFLW) players